Myoferlin is a protein that in humans is encoded by the MYOF gene.

Mutations in dysferlin, a protein associated with the plasma membrane, can cause muscle weakness that affects both proximal and distal muscles. The protein encoded by this gene is a type II membrane protein that is structurally similar to dysferlin. It is a member of the ferlin family and associates with both plasma and nuclear membranes. Myoferlin contains C2 domains that play a role in calcium-mediated membrane fusion events, suggesting that it may be involved in membrane regeneration and repair. Myoferlin also contains a FerA domain. FerA domains have been shown to interact with the membrane, suggesting that FerA domain in myoferlin may contribute to myoferlin's membrane interaction mechanism. Myoferlin is overexpressed in several types of cancers, especially triple-negative breast cancer. Overexpression of myoferlin is associated with proliferation, migration and invasion of cancer cells and silencing myoferlin's gene in triple-negative breast cancer can significantly reduce tumor growth and metastatic progression. Two transcript variants encoding different isoforms have been found for this gene. Other possible variants have been detected, but their full-length natures have not been determined.

References

Further reading